The Miss Illinois World competition is a beauty pageant that selects the representative for Illinois in the Miss World America pageant.

The current Miss Illinois World is Ansima Rosette Mamboleo of Maywood.

Winners 
Color key

Notes to table

References

External links

Illinois culture
Beauty pageants in the United States
History of women in Illinois